Pano Aqil, is a tehsil of Sukkur District in the Sindh province of Pakistan. It consists of 12 union councils According to 2017 Census of Pakistan, the population of Pano Akil was estimated to be 75,805.

References

Sukkur District
Populated places in Sindh